The Wolf Warriors also known as the Macau Wolf Warriors is a professional basketball club in the ASEAN Basketball League (ABL) based in Macau. The team was formerly based Zhuhai and was known as Zhuhai Wolf Warriors.

History
The then Zhuhai Wolf Warriors entered ABL in August 2018. The Warriors are claimed to be the first professional team based in Zhuhai city in Guangdong, China in any sports. The team relocated in Macau before the start of the 2019–20 ABL season.

Roster

Home venues
Initially, the Macau Wolf Warriors' home venue was at the Jinan University which has a 2,500-capacity basketball venue. They later moved their home venue to the Doumen Gymnasium in Zhuhai, China.

Current
 Foshan Shishan Gymnasium, Foshan
 Zhongshan Shaxi Gymnasium, Zhongshan

Former
 Doumen Gymnasium, Zhuhai
 Zhuhai Jinan University, Zhuhai
 University of Macau Sports Complex, Macau

Season by season

Head coaches

References

Sport in Zhuhai
Sports teams in Guangdong
ASEAN Basketball League teams
Basketball teams in Macau
2018 establishments in China
Basketball teams established in 2018